Yimella is a genus of bacteria from the family Dermacoccaceae.

References

Micrococcales
Bacteria genera